"Je m'en vais" is a song by French singer Vianney released on 17 October 2016, under the label Tôt ou tard. The music video was released on 7 November 2016.

Music video
A music video for the song was released onto YouTube on 7 November 2016 at a total length of three minutes and fourteen seconds.

Track listing

Charts

Weekly charts

Year-end charts

Release history

References 

2016 singles
2016 songs
French-language songs